The 2021 NCAA Division I women's basketball tournament was a single-elimination tournament of 64 teams to determine the National Collegiate Athletic Association (NCAA) Division I college basketball national champion for the 2020–21 NCAA Division I women's basketball season. The 39th edition of the tournament began on March 21, 2021, in sites around San Antonio, Texas, and concluded with the championship game on April 4 at the Alamodome, with the Stanford Cardinal defeating the Arizona Wildcats 54–53 to win their third NCAA title.

Due to logistical considerations surrounding the ongoing COVID-19 pandemic (which resulted in the cancellation of the 2020 tournament), and mirroring a similar decision by the men's tournament, the entire tournament was played in the San Antonio area rather than at sites across the country, with some first and second round games played in nearby San Marcos and Austin. The Alamodome hosted all games from the regional semifinals onward, including the originally-awarded Final Four and championship game.

Four schools, America East champion Stony Brook, Big South champion High Point, Missouri Valley champion Bradley and Utah Valley from the WAC (California Baptist won the WAC tournament, but was ineligible for the NCAA tournament because it is in the third year of a four-year transition from Division II), made their first appearance in the tournament.

Additionally, Tennessee continued its record streak of making every edition of the tournament. Arizona made its first-ever appearance in the Final Four. UConn extended its record streak of 13 consecutive Final Four appearances. Wake Forest and Washington State made their first appearances since 1988 and 1991, respectively.

Tournament procedure 

	
The tournament's 64 teams consisted of the 31 conference champions (down from 32, due to the Ivy League having cancelled all winter athletics due to COVID-19), and 33 "at-large" bids extended by the Selection Committee.

This tournament was the first since 1983 in which the RPI was not used in the selection process. On May 4, 2020, the NCAA announced that it would replace the RPI with the NET (NCAA Evaluation Tool), a metric that has been used in the selection process for the men's tournament since 2019. The women's version of the NET uses input data specific to the women's game but is otherwise functionally identical to the men's version.

Schedule and venues 
On February 5, 2021, the NCAA announced that due to logistical considerations associated with the COVID-19 pandemic (which prompted the cancellation of the 2020 tournament), the entirety of the tournament would be conducted at sites in and around San Antonio and Austin (mirroring a similar decision for the men's tournament, which would similarly use venues in and around its Final Four host city of Indianapolis), rather than across the country; 

First and second round (March 21–22, 23–24)
 Alamodome, San Antonio, Texas (Host: University of the Incarnate Word)
 Bill Greehey Arena, San Antonio (Hosts: University of Houston and St. Mary's University)
 Frank Erwin Center, Austin, Texas (Host: University of Texas at Austin)
 Strahan Arena, San Marcos, Texas (Host: Texas State University)
 UTSA Convocation Center, San Antonio (Host: the University of Texas at San Antonio) 

Regional semifinals and finals (Sweet Sixteen and Elite Eight) (March 27–30)
 Alamodome, San Antonio (Hosts: the University of the Incarnate Word and the University of Texas at San Antonio)

National semifinals and championship (final Four and championship) (April 2 and 4)
 Alamodome, San Antonio (Hosts: the University of the Incarnate Word, the University of Texas at San Antonio, and San Antonio Sports)

The Alamodome had two courts for first- and second-round games, and was converted to a single court for later rounds. Practices were held at the Alamodome and the Henry B. González Convention Center. The regions were named after famous sites in San Antonio: the Alamo, the HemisFair, the Mercado, and the River Walk.

All games were played behind closed doors (with only friends and family present) until the Sweet Sixteen at the Alamodome, which operated at 17% capacity (10,880) for the remainder of the tournament.

Facilities inequality 
Concerns over gender inequality were raised prior to the tournament, citing differences in the quality of facilities and amenities between the women's and men's tournament; among other examples, Arizona coach Adia Barnes criticized the lack of weight training equipment in the workout room (consisting of only a single tower of weights, in comparison to the larger weight room of the men's tournament). A video by Oregon forward Sedona Prince showing the aforementioned weight room drew wider attention to the disparity on social media. Other forms of disparities were noted, including differing COVID-19 testing protocols, smaller "swag bags", and different food options.

The NCAA had originally planned for the full weight room to only become available for the Sweet Sixteen round. Vice President of Women's Basketball Lynn Holzman stated that the NCAA had planned to expand the facilities in the workout room over the course of the tournament due to space constraints, but were "actively working to enhance existing resources at practice courts, including additional weight training equipment." Barnes stated that the Henry B. González Convention Center had "plenty of open areas" that could have been used, and that "it takes people like me that were pro players being a voice for things to change. There's a lot of voices out there. People care now. The fact that the NCAA responded so fast, I think that's good. That's meaningful." 

In a letter obtained by tournament broadcaster ESPN on March 22, NCAA president Mark Emmert stated that "much has been resolved", but that he would investigate "exactly how we found ourselves in this situation", and "directed our leadership team and appropriate staff to assess all the services, resources, and facilities provided to both the men's and women's teams so that we have a completely clear comparison". The America East Conference and Ivy League sent a letter to Emmert, arguing that the incident "warrants a comprehensive discussion once the tournaments conclude about how we—national office staff and membership—can protect and ensure equity across all championships in the future, but especially in the sport of basketball."  

The incident led to discussions surrounding other forms of inequalities between the men's and women's tournaments, including their difference in budget, no revenue bonuses awarded to schools for winning the tournament, NCAA marketing of "March Madness" having focused almost exclusively on the men's tournament (without the women's tournament having ever officially used the name; and tournament branding often used generic "NCAA Women's Basketball" logos instead), and the men's tournament often being referred to as "the NCAA tournament" by media and the general public with no disambiguation. In a Sportico op-ed, America East commissioner Amy Huchthausen accused the NCAA of "restricting women’s basketball from taking advantage of an emerging market", noting that the NCAA's official sponsorships are managed by the CBS Sports/Turner Sports consortium that broadcasts the men's tournament, and that the ESPN contract to televise the women's tournament (which is bundled with those of other NCAA championships) "provides a measure of financial certainty, but it does not provide women's basketball (or any of the other sports, for that matter) an incentive to grow". 

The NCAA commissioned an independent review of gender equality among all of its championships by the law firm by Kaplan Hecker & Fink LLP; the first phase, focusing specifically on NCAA basketball championships, was published on August 3, 2021. The review concluded that the structure of the NCAA's operations were designed to "maximize the value of and support to the Division I Men's Basketball Championship as the primary source of funding for the NCAA and its membership"; it found that the CBS/Turner sponsorship contracts require advertisers to pay for marketing rights across all of the NCAA's championships (including the men's tournament, which can be costly), and that advertisers also had to separately pay ESPN for airtime during the women's tournament's telecasts. The review included several recommendations, including that:

 The media rights for the women's Division I basketball tournament be sold separately from other NCAA championships. It was estimated that media rights to the women's tournament could be worth at least $81 million per-season (in comparison to the $34 million total of the current ESPN contract).
 The women's tournament be expanded to 68 teams, as with the men's tournament.
 The women's tournament adopt the same revenue distribution framework as the men's tournament.
 The NCAA's contracts be renegotiated to provide more opportunities for entities who wish to sponsor specific NCAA championships other than the men's basketball tournament.
 The "March Madness" branding be extended to the women's tournament.
 The men's and women's Final Four be hosted together in the same venue.
The NCAA implemented two of these recommendations—the expansion to a 68-team format, and use of the "March Madness" branding—for the 2022 tournament.

Original 2021 NCAA tournament schedule and venues

The tournament's first two rounds were originally scheduled to be hosted by the top sixteen seeds. The following were the sites initially selected to host the later rounds of the 2021 tournament:

Regional semifinals and finals (Sweet Sixteen and Elite Eight) (March 26–29)
 Times Union Center, Albany, New York (Hosts: Siena College and Metro Atlantic Athletic Conference)
 H-E-B Center at Cedar Park, Cedar Park, Texas (Host: University of Texas at Austin)
 Cintas Center, Cincinnati, Ohio (Hosts: Xavier University and Cincinnati USA Sports Commission)
 Spokane Veterans Memorial Arena, Spokane, Washington (Host: University of Idaho)

National semifinals and championship (final Four and championship) (April 2 and 4)
 Alamodome, San Antonio (Hosts: the University of the Incarnate Word, the University of Texas at San Antonio, and San Antonio Sports)

This is the third time the women's Final Four will be played in San Antonio, having previously been played in the city in 2002 and 2010.

Qualification and selection

Automatic qualifiers
The following teams automatically qualified for the 2021 NCAA field by virtue of winning their conference's tournament.

Tournament seeds

Bracket
All times are listed as Central Daylight Time (UTC−5)
* – Denotes overtime period

Alamo regional – San Antonio, Texas

* – Denotes overtime period

Alamo regional final

HemisFair regional – San Antonio, Texas

* – Denotes overtime period

HemisFair regional final

Mercado regional – San Antonio, Texas

* – Denotes overtime period

Mercado regional final

River Walk regional – San Antonio, Texas

* – Denotes overtime period

River Walk regional final

Final Four
During the Final Four round, Stanford, the winner of the Alamo Regional defeated South Carolina, the winner of the HemisFair Regional. Arizona, the winner of the Mercado Regional defeated UConn, the winner of the River Walk Regional.  In the championship game, Stanford defeated Arizona by a score of 54–53 to take the 2021 title.

Alamodome – San Antonio, Texas

National semifinals

National championship

Final Four all-tournament team
 Haley Jones (MOP), Stanford 
 Lexie Hull, Stanford
 Aari McDonald, Arizona
 Zia Cooke, South Carolina
 Paige Bueckers, UConn

Record by conference

The R64, R32, S16, E8, F4, CG, and NC columns indicate how many teams from each conference were in the round of 64 (first round), round of 32 (second round), Sweet 16, Elite Eight, Final Four, championship game, and national champion, respectively.

 The American, America East, Atlantic 10, Atlantic Sun, Big Sky, Big South, Big West, Conference USA, Colonial, Horizon, MAAC, MEAC, Mountain West, Northeast, Ohio Valley, Patriot, Southern, Southland, Sun Belt, SWAC, and WAC conferences each had one representative that was eliminated in the first round.

Media coverage

Television
ESPN served as broadcaster of the tournament, as part of its multi-year deal to broadcast NCAA national championships. Following a similar broadcast arrangement to the men's tournament under the CBS/Turner consortium, ESPN announced that all games in the tournament would be televised nationally in their entirety by either ESPN, ESPN2, ESPNU, or, for the first time, ABC (marking the first women's tournament to include coverage on broadcast television since 1995), rather than use a mix of regional broadcasts, streaming, and "whiparound" feeds.

Kerry Callahan became the first woman to serve as producer for ESPN's coverage of the Women's Final Four.

Studio host and analysts
 Maria Taylor (Host) (First, Second rounds, Regionals, Final Four, and National championship game)
 Kelsey Riggs (Host) (first round)
 Andy Landers (Analyst) (First, Second rounds, Regionals, Final Four, and National championship game)
 Rebecca Lobo (Analyst) (first and second rounds)
 Carolyn Peck (Analyst) (Regionals, Final Four, and National championship game)
 Andraya Carter (Analyst) (first round)
 Monica McNutt (Analyst) (first round)

Broadcast assignments

First and Second rounds
 Ryan Ruocco, Rebecca Lobo & Holly Rowe (1st Round only) – Frank Erwin Center
 Beth Mowins, Renee Montgomery (1st & 2nd Rounds – Tuesday) & Debbie Antonelli (2nd Round – Wednesday) – Frank Erwin Center and Alamodome
 Courtney Lyle & Carolyn Peck – Alamodome
 Pam Ward & LaChina Robinson – Strahan Arena, Alamodome and Bill Greehey Arena
 Eric Frede & Tamika Catchings – Frank Erwin Center, Alamodome and Bill Greehey Arena
 Kevin Fitzgerald & Christy Thomaskutty – Frank Erwin Center, Strahan Arena and Alamodome
 Jenn Hildreth & Kelly Gramlich – Strahan Arena, Alamodome and UTSA Convocation Center
 Tiffany Greene & Steffi Sorensen – Bill Greehey Arena, Alamodome and UTSA Convocation Center
 Sam Ravech & Brenda VanLengen – Bill Greehey Arena and UTSA Convocation Center
 Roy Philpott & Brooke Weisbrod – Bill Greehey Arena and UTSA Convocation Center

Regionals
 Ryan Ruocco, Rebecca Lobo & Holly Rowe – Alamodome
 Beth Mowins, Debbie Antonelli & LaChina Robinson – Alamodome
Final Four
 Ryan Ruocco, Rebecca Lobo, Holly Rowe & LaChina Robinson – Alamodome

Radio
Westwood One has exclusive radio rights to the entire tournament. Teams participating in the Elite Eight, Final Four, and Championship will be allowed to have their own local broadcasts, but they won’t be allowed to stream those broadcasts online.

Regional finals
 Ted Emrich (Monday), Patrick Kinas (Tuesday) & Krista Blunk – Alamodome
 Roxy Bernstein & Kristen Kozlowski – Alamodome

Final Four and Championship
 Ryan Radtke & Debbie Antonelli – Alamodome

See also 
 2021 Women's National Invitation Tournament
 2021 Women's Basketball Invitational
 2021 NCAA Division II women's basketball tournament
 2021 NCAA Division III women's basketball tournament
 2021 NCAA Division I men's basketball tournament

References

External links 
 NCAA Women's Basketball Division I

 

2020–21 NCAA Division I women's basketball season
NCAA Division I women's basketball tournament
NCAA
NCAA
NCAA
NCAA Division I